Ahmad ibn al-Amin al-Shinqiti (ca. 1863–1913) is one of Mauritania's most famous writers. He is the author of the geographical, literary and historical compendium Al-Wasit fi tarájim udaba al-Shinqit, ed. Fuad Sayyid, Cairo 1958. The survey is the only major Arabic-language work about Mauritania published by a Mauritanian author.

Bibliography
Chouki El Hamel, "The Transmission of Islamic Knowledge in Moorish Society from the Rise of the Almoravids to the 19th Century", Journal of Religion in Africa, Vol. 29, Fasc. 1 (Feb., 1999), pp. 62–87

References

Mauritanian male writers
1860s births
1913 deaths
20th-century historians
People from Adrar Region
Mauritanian historians
20th-century male writers